March is an unincorporated community in southeast Dallas County, in the U.S. state of Missouri. The community is located at the intersection of Missouri routes 38 and F.

History
A post office called March was established in 1888, and remained in operation until 1915. The community secured a post office in the month of March, hence the name.

References

Unincorporated communities in Dallas County, Missouri
Unincorporated communities in Missouri